The 1986–87 Santa Clara Broncos men's basketball team
 represented Santa Clara University as a member of the West Coast Athletic Conference during the 1986-87 Season. Led by head coach Carroll Williams, the Broncos finished with a record of 18–14, and a WCC record of 6–8. The Broncos beat Portland, Saint Mary's, and Pepperdine to win the West Coast Athletic Conference tournament, and received an automatic bid into the NCAA tournament. Santa Clara was beaten by No. 2 seed Iowa in the opening round.

Roster

Schedule and results

|-
!colspan=9 style=| Regular season

|-
!colspan=9 style=| WCAC Tournament

|-
!colspan=9 style=| NCAA Tournament

References

Santa Clara Broncos men's basketball seasons
Santa Clara
1986 in sports in California
1987 in sports in California
Santa Clara